The Bangladesh cricket team toured Sri Lanka in July 2019 to play three One Day International (ODI) matches. Originally, the tour was scheduled to take place in December 2019, but it was moved to avoid clashing with the 2019–20 Bangladesh Premier League tournament.

On 11 May 2019, the Bangladesh Cricket Board (BCB) President Nazmul Hasan Papon stated that the Bangladesh team was unlikely to proceed with a planned tour to Sri Lanka in July, citing fears that the country could be hit by another terrorist attack, following the Easter bombings on 21 April 2019. On 27 June 2019, it was reported that four National Security Intelligence (NSI) personnel, the civilian intelligence agency of Bangladesh, were sent to Sri Lanka to assess the situation. On 8 July 2019, Sri Lanka Cricket confirmed that the tour would go ahead, with all three matches played at the R. Premadasa Stadium in Colombo.

For the series, Sri Lanka named a squad of twenty-two players, which was later trimmed down to the final squad of seventeen. Chief Selector, Ashantha de Mel, said this would allow them to experiment with the line-ups for each match on an individual basis. Prior to the series, Bangladesh's captain Mashrafe Mortaza was ruled out of the tour due to a hamstring injury. Tamim Iqbal was named as captain for the first time in ODIs.

Sri Lankan bowler Lasith Malinga retired from ODIs following the first match of the series in Colombo. He took a wicket with his final ball, finishing his career as the ninth-highest wicket-taker in ODIs, with 338 dismissals. Sri Lanka Cricket announced that the final ODI was dedicated to Sri Lankan bowler Nuwan Kulasekara, who retired from international cricket before the series.

Sri Lanka won the first two ODI matches, therefore taking an unassailable lead and winning the series. It was their first ODI series win at home since beating the West Indies 3–0 in November 2015. Sri Lanka won the third match by 122 runs to win the series 3–0.

Squads

Ahead of the series, Mashrafe Mortaza and Mohammad Saifuddin were ruled out of Bangladesh's squad due to injury and were replaced by Farhad Reza and Taskin Ahmed respectively. On 23 July 2019, Shafiul Islam was added to Bangladesh's squad.

Amila Aponso, Niroshan Dickwella, Danushka Gunathilaka, Lakshan Sandakan, Lahiru Madushanka were named in Sri Lanka's initial twenty-two man squad, but did not make the final seventeen cricketers for the series.

Tour match

ODI series

1st ODI

2nd ODI

3rd ODI

Statistics

Most runs

Most wickets

New Zealand cricket team in Sri Lanka in 2019

References

External links
 Series home at ESPN Cricinfo

2019 in Bangladeshi cricket
2019 in Sri Lankan cricket
International cricket competitions in 2019
Bangladeshi cricket tours of Sri Lanka